Famelica monotropis is a species of sea snail, a marine gastropod mollusk in the family Raphitomidae.

Description
The length of the shell attains 9.3 mm, its diameter 3.3 mm.

The thin, white, subhyaline shell has a fusiform shape and a turreted spire with an acuminate apex. It contains eight whorls. The suture is impressed. The keel is protruding and sharp. The subsutural band coincides with the rest of the surface. The growth lines are barely perceptible. One can notice with a lens on the body whorl, below the keel, two obsolete decurrent threads. The aperture is oblong. The wide siphonal canal is very long. The narrow columella stands upright and is very sharp at the base. It shows a very thin callus. The outer lip is thin and sharp.

Distribution
This marine species occurs off the Azores.

References

 Gofas, S.; Le Renard, J.; Bouchet, P. (2001). Mollusca. in: Costello, M.J. et al. (eds), European Register of Marine Species: a check-list of the marine species in Europe and a bibliography of guides to their identification. Patrimoines Naturels. 50: 180-213.

External links
 

monotropis
Gastropods described in 1896